Ernő Pattantyús-Ábrahám de Dancka (15 March 1882, Debrecen - 7 May 1945, Budapest) was a Hungarian journalist and writer. During the Second World War he published many antifascist articles against the Nazi Germany. His older brother was Dezső Pattantyús-Ábrahám, a Hungarian politician and Prime Minister of the Counter-revolutionary Government during the Hungarian Soviet Republic.

External links 
 Biography

Hungarian male novelists
Hungarian journalists
1882 births
1945 deaths
20th-century Hungarian novelists
20th-century Hungarian male writers
20th-century Hungarian poets
Hungarian male poets
20th-century journalists